is one of the oldest extant Japanese martial arts, and an exemplar of  bujutsu. The Tenshin Shōden Katori Shintō-ryū was founded by Iizasa Ienao, born in 1387 in Iizasa village (modern Takomachi, Chiba Prefecture), who was living near Katori Shrine (Sawara City, Chiba Prefecture) at the time. The ryū gives 1447 as the year it was founded, but some scholars state that it was about 1480.

History

Foundation

Iizasa Ienao (飯篠 長威斎 家直 Iizasa Chōi-sai Ienao, c.1387 – c.1488) was a respected spearman and swordsman whose daimyō was deposed, encouraging him to relinquish control of his household to conduct purification rituals and study martial arts in isolation.

Iizasa was born in the village of Iizasa in Shimōsa Province.  When he was young, he moved to the vicinity of the famous Katori Shrine, a venerable Shinto institution northeast of Tokyo in modern-day Chiba Prefecture. The Katori Shrine enjoys a considerable martial reputation; the Shrine's Kami, Futsunushi  being revered as a spirit of swordsmanship and martial arts.

After studying swordsmanship he went to Kyoto, where, according to most authorities, he was employed in his youth by the eighth Muromachi shōgun, Ashikaga Yoshimasa (1436–1490), a devotee of the martial arts. Iizasa was later known as Yamashiro no Kami (governor of Yamashiro Province) in accordance with a practice of Muromachi times, whereby noted warriors took old court titles. Later on in his life, Iizasa became a Buddhist lay monk and was known as Chōi-sai, sai being a character that many noted swordsmen chose for their martial name.

When Chōi-sai returned home, he offered prayers to the deities of both Katori Shrine and Kashima Shrine, the latter being a famous local shrine in nearby Ibaraki Prefecture, where shrine officials themselves reputedly practised a form of swordsmanship, called 'Hitotsu no Tachi' (the solitary sword). Even today the Kashima Shrine training hall attracts Kendo practitioners from around the world, and the chief object of interest for visitors is the shrine's sacred sword. Supplementing his considerable skills with assorted weaponry, Chōi-sai was also an expert in Musō Jikiden ryū yawaragi, holding the position of seventh Headmaster in the history of that ryū. 

Legend says at the age of 60 Chōi-sai spent 1000 days in Katori Shrine practicing martial techniques day and night, until the kami of the shrine, Futsunushi (経津), appeared to him in a dream and handed down the secrets of martial strategy in a scroll named Mokuroku Heiho no Shinsho.  He called his swordsmanship style derived from this miraculous dream the Tenshin Shōden Katori Shintō-ryū, the "Heavenly True, Correctly Transmitted Style of the Way of the God of Katori".

This legend is typical of martial arts ryū and other cultural forms as well. Ryū founders often attributed their mastery to magical teachings transmitted by Shinto or Buddhist deities, by long-dead historical figures like Minamoto no Yoshitsune, or by legendary supernatural creatures such as the tengu, Japanese goblins commonly depicted with a long red nose.

Iizasa's Tenshin Shōden Katori Shintō-ryū, thus presumably linked to the sacred tradition of both Katori and Kashima Shrines, was transmitted through his own family.

Headmasters
 Iizasa Yamashiro-no-Kami (later Iga-no-Kami) Ienao Choisai, died 15 April 1488
 Iizasa Wakasa-no-Kami Morichika
 Iizasa Wakasa-no-Kami Morinobu
 Iizasa Yamashiro-no-Kami Moritsuna
 Iizasa Saemon-no-Jo Morihide
 Iizasa Oi-no-Kami Morishige
 Iizasa Shuri-no-Suke Morinobu
 Iizasa Shuri-no-Suke Morinaga
 Iizasa Shuri-no-Suke Morihisa
 Iizasa Shuri-no-Suke Morisada
 Iizasa Shuri-no-Suke Morishige
 Iizasa Shuri-no-Suke Moritsugu
 Iizasa Shuri-no-Suke Morikiyo
 Iizasa Shuri-no-Suke Nagateru
 Iizasa Shuri-no-Suke Moriteru
 Iizasa Shuri-no-Suke Morishige (Kan-Rikusai), died 11 July 1853, at 78 years of age
 Iizasa Shuri-no-Suke Morifusa, died 4 January 1854, at 51 years of age
 Iizasa Shuri-no-Suke Morisada, participated in the Mito Rebellion against the shogunate, died 2 June 1896, at 56 years of age
 Iizasa Shuri-no-Suke Kinjiro, died in 1943
 Iizasa Shuri-no-Suke Yasusada (current)

In 1896, the 18th sōke died without a male heir. Yamaguchi Eikan shihan governed the ryu until his death 14 March 1917. Until Iizasa Kinjiro married into the Iizasa household, the following eight shihan headed the ryu:
 Tamai Kisaburo
 Shiina Ichizo
 Ito Tanekichi
 Kuboki Sazaemon
 Isobe Kohei
 Motomiya (Hongu) Toranosuke 
 Hayashi Yazaemon (1882–1964)
 Kamagata Minosuke

Recent history

Tenshin Shōden Katori Shintō-ryū is the source tradition of many Japanese martial arts. Several famous swordsmen (including Tsukahara Bokuden and Matsumoto Bizen no kami Masanobu) who learned directly from Chōi-sai or his immediate followers became founders of their own schools, with either the same name (Shintō, written with a variety of other characters) or different names: Kashima Shintō-ryū (Bokuden-ryū), Kashima-ryū, Kashima shin-ryū (founded by Matsumoto), Arima-ryū, Ichiu-ryū, Shigen-ryū, and others.

Iizasa devised a unique method to ensure warriors could train without serious injury and yet maintain a resemblance to 'riai' (integrity of principle) and combative reality. The weapon training of the ryū, in the form of kata-bujutsu (pre-arranged, combative training drills), illustrates this well. What appears to the outsider as merely a block of the opponent's attacking weapon is, in actuality, only a substitute for the part of the attacker's body intended to be cut or struck. Thus, full impact training could be maintained with safety to the practitioners. Thereby, he extended the training of his students to the use of other weapon systems as well, in order to be totally familiar with their capabilities and not be surprised on the battlefield by something unexpectedly different.

The uniqueness of Iizasa's Tenshin Shōden Katori Shintō-ryū is still evident today, in the particular aspects of weapon-wielding, posture, stance, and foot and body movements which make allowance for the fact that the bushi (classical samurai warriors) of his era would be wearing 'yoroi' (armour) weighing around 35 kg, and fighting on uneven terrain. These factors tend to keep the wearer's feet firmly and flat on the ground, and slow down mobility considerably.  The distinctive techniques and tactics of this ryū also acknowledge the design of classical Japanese armour, which, although protecting the wearer well, had many 'suki' (openings). The main attacking areas included: under the wrists; inside and behind the legs; the hip area; the space between the 'kabuto' (helmet) and 'dō' (chest protector) where the neck arteries and veins could be easily severed. The signature, 'omote' (basic-battlefield) sword technique of the ryū, 'makiuchi-jodan', was created by Iizasa because the bushi could not raise the sword above the head due to the obstruction of the kabuto, and secondly, notwithstanding that restriction, a very powerful 'chopping' blow from above was still needed to be generated in order to produce the maximum destructive force for when circumstances dictated attacking areas of the 'yoroi' other than the 'suki'.

On 6 March 1960 (昭和35年6月3日), the school received the first ever "Intangible Cultural Asset" designation given to a martial art by the Japanese government, naming Hayashi Yazaemon, Ōtake Risuke, and Iizasa Yasusada as its guardians. The Iizasa family dojo was also designated a Cultural Asset. The designation of Cultural Asset status shifted to the Chiba Prefectural Government in 1985 and the art was recertified, again naming Ōtake Risuke and Iizasa Yasusada as guardians. Ōtake Nobutoshi and Kyōsō Shigetoshi were also certified as guardians on 30 March 2004 (平成16年3月30日).

The school claims to have never aligned itself with any estate or faction, no matter what stipend was offered.  This allowed the ryū to maintain its independence and integrity.

Tenshin Shōden Katori Shintō-ryū was popularised in the west by the extensive research and writings of late Donn F. Draeger (1922–1982).

The current, twentieth generation headmaster, is Iizasa Yasusada (飯篠 修理亮 快貞 Iizasa Shūri-no-suke Yasusada). He does not teach his family's system and had instead appointed as his main representative instructor Risuke Ōtake who has a personal dojo close to Narita City. Upon Ōtake Risuke's retirement, he announced his eldest son Nobutoshi would replace him as Shihan and his younger son Shigetoshi would support him as shihan-dai . Kyōsō Shigetoshi was appointed shihan in September 2017, and Ōtake Nobutoshi was issued hamon (excommunicated) on 9 December 2018. However, both Otake Risuke, Otake Nobutoshi and Kyōsō Shigetoshi are still recognised as guardians of the school, by the Chiba Prefecture Board of Cultural Affairs.

Gallery

Curriculum 

The Tenshin Shōden Katori Shintō-ryū is a comprehensive martial system.  This means that unlike modern martial ways such as kendo or iaido, which concentrate on one specific area of training, study is made of a broad range of martial skills.

The main emphasis of the school is kenjutsu (sword techniques). A wide range of other weapons are being taught as part of the curriculum, but the sword remains the central weapon.

The primary curriculum includes:

The Gogyo and Gokui kata are only taught to advanced practitioners after many years of fundamental practice.

Other, more advanced areas of study of the school include:
Ninjutsu (intelligence gathering and analysis)
Chikujojutsu (field fortification art)
Gunbai-Heihō (strategy and tactics)
Tenmon Chirigaku (Chinese astrology and geomantic divination)
In-Yo kigaku (philosophical and mystical aspects derived from Mikkyō, specifically Shingon Buddhism)

Keppan

Historically, before beginning any training in Tenshin Shōden Katori Shintō-ryū, every prospective pupil had to sign an oath of allegiance to the school. The method was to make keppan (blood oath) in support of the following kisho or kishomon (pledge). This oath was a written one with the prospective member being required to sign his name in his own blood. The applicant would prick or cut a finger or sometimes the inner arm and with the blood drawn, sign the following pledge:

On becoming a member of the Tenshin Shōden Katori Shintō-ryū which has been transmitted by the Great Deity of the Katori Shrine, I herewith affirm my pledge that:
I will not have the impertinence to discuss or demonstrate details of the ryū to either non-members or members, even if they are relatives;
I will not engage in altercations or misuse the art against others;
I will never engage in any kind of gambling nor frequent disreputable places.
I will not cross swords with any followers of other martial traditions without authorization.
I hereby pledge to firmly adhere to each of the above articles. Should I break any of these articles I will submit to the punishment of the Great Deity of Katori and the Great Deity Marishiten. Herewith I solemnly swear and affix my blood seal to this oath to these Great Deities.

Marishiten is originally the Brahman figure of Krishna. In later Chinese Buddhist mythology she became the heavenly queen who lives in one of the stars of the Great Bear. She is mostly depicted with eight arms, two of which are the symbols of the sun and the moon.

Most Tenshin Shōden Katori Shintō-ryū variants headed by instructors other than Risuke Ōtake do not require keppan. However, Risuke Ōtake regarded the keppan as a strict requirement for all candidates seeking entrance into his school in order to preserve the secrecy and integrity of the ryū's teachings.  Even so, students joining his various overseas branches readily receive instruction from the local instructors until such time as they may be able to travel to Ōtake's dojo to take keppan.  Additional opportunities arise should an overseas dojo be visited by one of the school's senior instructors who has been authorised to take keppan from those members wishing so to do.  This was the case in 2007, and again in 2009 when Kyōsō Shigetoshi, younger son of Risuke Ōtake, held an open European seminar and existing participants of varying levels of expertise from the different organisations were invited to take keppan.

Branches
The mainline of Tenshin Shōden Katori Shintō-ryū is currently represented by the Kyōsō Shibu led by Kyōsō Shigetoshi, Ōtake Risuke's younger son. The honbu dojo is located at Iizasa Yasusada's home near the Katori shrine and is used by branches in good standing on special occasions. The Kyōsō Shibu regularly trains out of the Shisui Town Community Plaza and the Matsuyamashita Koen Sports Gymnasium in Inzai City. Several branches have existed alongside or split from the mainline with varying ties to the Iizasa family.

Shinbukan Dojo – The Shinbukan Dojo in Narita was built by Ōtake Risuke and represented the mainline of the ryū for over fifty years.Before Ōtake Risuke retired as shihan, he named Otake Nobutoshi as his successor and continued to oversee instruction in the Shinbukan which was led by Otake Nobutoshi, until his death in 2021. Otake Nobutoshi continues to lead training in the Shinbukan.
Sugino Dojo – Sugino Yoshio, a judoka, began training in Katori Shintō-ryū when Kanō Jigorō invited four shihan to teach swordsmanship at the Kodokan dojo. He continued his training under Shiina Ichizo. Many of his students have taught Katori Shintō-ryū outside of Japan. His son, Sugino Yukihiro has continued to teach, and has received public acknowledgement from Iizasa Yasusada as representing an official branch of Katori Shintō-ryū. 
Hatakeyama Goro – A high-ranking student of Sugino's, Hatakeyama Goro, had led several dojos internationally prior to his death. These dojos now operate independently.
Sugawara Budo – Sugawara Tetsutaka edited and published The Deity and The Sword through his own publishing company. He was awarded menkyo kyoshi (teaching license) in 1986, but later separated from the mainline. He currently teaches Katori Shintō-ryū as part of Sugawara Martial Arts Institute's curriculum.
Noda-ha – Noda Shinzan (1848–1917) began training in Katori Shintō-ryū in 1853 under Yamada Naomune, a retainer of the Date clan. Many Date retainers had trained in Katori Shintō-ryū and developed their own distinctive style. After Naomune's death in 1912, Shinzan enrolled his grandson, Seizan, under Yamaguchi Kumajiro, the most senior mainline shihan at the time. Following the deaths of Yamaguchi and his grandfather, Noda Seizan continued to train under Motomiya Toranosuke. After Motomiya's passing, Noda studied with Hayashi Yazaemon who began reforming and standardizing the mainline curriculum. Finding his style incompatible with Hayashi's, Noda Seizan quietly withdrew to private teaching, referring to his branch as Noda-ha Katori Shintō-ryū. Noda-ha preserves some kata that have been lost in the mainline.
Ichigidō – Shiigi Munenori began training in Katori Shintō-ryū under his father, who had trained with Motomiya Toranosuke, before formally training at Ōtake Risuke's dojo for over thirty years. He incorporates Katori Shintō-ryū as part of the curriculum of his Ichigidō organization and maintains a positive relationship with the Iizasa family. He writes "Tenshin Shōden Katori Shintō-ryū" as "天真正伝香取神刀流" with '道' (way) with '刀' (sword).
Yoseikan Budo – Mochizuki Minoru, a judoka from the Kodokan who trained alongside Sugino Yoshio, has incorporated Katori Shintō-ryū into the curriculum of Yoseikan Budo. His son, Mochizuki Hiro, now heads Yoseikan.

Ranking & Appointed Positions
The different branches recognize different levels of ranks and appointments. The traditional ranks are a variant of the menkyo system.

Ōtake

Ranks
 Mokuroku (目録, "catalog")
 Menkyo (免許, "license, certificate")
 Gokui Kaiden (極意皆伝, "deepest transmission")

Appointments
 Shidōsha (指導者, "mentor, coach"; given as license to teach outside of Shinbukan dojo)
 Shihan (師範, 'instructor'; head-teacher)

Sugino
The Sugino line uses modern dan system only, in respect of Yoshio Sugino's (10th dan) judo teacher Kanō Jigorō, who was using this way of ranking as well, excluding the traditional menkyo system.

Hatakeyama
The Hatakeyama line (which has no current headmaster) makes use of the modern dan system alongside the traditional menkyo system, issuing ranks in both with shōden/chūden/okuden gradations to create equivalent ranks from the menkyo system.

Ranks
1st dan – kirikami shōden 
2nd dan – kirikami chūden
3rd dan – mokuroku shōden
4th dan – mokuroku chūden
5th dan – menkyo mokuroku
6th dan – menkyo chūden
7th dan – menkyo okuden
8th dan – menkyo kaiden

Sugawara Budo
Sugawara Budo issues mokuroku and menkyo certifications. English-speaking members of Sugawara Budo refer to the rank of menkyo as a "kyōshi license", or "menkyo kyōshi".

Notable swordsmen in relation to Tenshin Shōden Katori Shintō-ryū
Tsukahara Bokuden – from the early sengoku period who developed his own style of swordsmanship Kashima Shintō-ryū
Musō Gonnosuke – founder of Shintō Musō-ryū
Miyamoto Musashi – he meditated in the Kashima-Katori shrines
Yamazaki Susumu – Shinsengumi officer, physician and spy
Katakura Murakiyo – eighth head of the Katakura clan, earned menkyo kaiden
Kuroda Yoshitaka – late Sengoku daimyo and advisor to Toyotomi Hideyoshi, appointed shihan
Takenaka Shigeharu – advisor to Toyotomi Hideyoshi and jōseki shihan of Katori Shintō-ryū
Kamiizumi Nobutsuna – founder of Shinkage-ryū, student of Katori Shintō-ryū, Nen-ryū, and Kage-ryū
Anazawa Morihide – founder of Anazawa-Ryū naginatajutsu, studied under 5th soke of Katori Shintō-ryū and killed at the Siege of Osaka

Notes

References

Further reading
 Amdur, Ellis (2002). Old School: Essays on Japanese Martial Traditions, Edgework, p. 21–45
 Draeger, Donn F. The Martial Arts and Ways of Japan series, 3 volumes.
 Friday, Karl F. (1997). Legacies of the Sword, the Kashima-Shinryu and Samurai Martial Culture, University of Hawaii Press, p. 26 & 93, 
 Hall, David Avalon. Marishiten: Buddhism and the warrior Goddess, Ph.D. dissertation, Ann Arbor: University microfilms, p. 274–292.
 Hurst III, G. Cameron (1998). Armed Martial Arts of Japan, Swordsmanship and Archery, Yale University Press, p. 46–49 & 58, 
 Mol, Serge (2001). Classical Fighting Arts of Japan, A Complete Guide to Koryu JuJutsu, Kodansha International, p. 43 & 151, 
 Ōtake, Risuke (1977). The Deity and the Sword – Katori Shinto-ryu Vol. 1, Japan, Japan Publications Trading Co.  (Original Japanese title for all three volumes in this series is Mukei Bunkazai Katori Shinto-ryu)
 Ōtake, Risuke (1977). The Deity and the Sword – Katori Shinto-ryu Vol. 2, Japan, Japan Publications Trading Co. 
 Ōtake, Risuke (1977). The Deity and the Sword – Katori Shinto-ryu Vol. 3, Japan, Japan Publications Trading Co. 
 Ōtake, Risuke (2016). Strategy and the Art of Peace: Tenshinshō-den Katori Shintō-ryū (English Edition). Nippon Budokan Foundation.  (description page)
 Ratti, Oscar & Westbrook, Adele (1973). Secrets of the Samurai, A Survey of the Martial Arts of Feudal Japan, Charles E. Tuttle Co. 
 Skoss, Diane (editor) (1997). Koryu Bujutsu, Classical Warrior Traditions of Japan, Koryu Books, vol 1, 
 Skoss, Diane (editor) (1999). Sword & Spirit, Classical Warrior Traditions of Japan, Koryu Books, vol 2, p. 67–69. 
 Skoss, Diane (editor) (2002). Keiko Shokon, Classical Warrior Traditions of Japan, Koryu Books, vol 3, 
 Sugino, Yoshio & Ito, Kikue (1977). Tenshin Shoden Katori Shinto-ryu Budo Kyohan  (A Textbook of Tenshin Shoden Katori Shinto-ryu Martial Training; originally published in 1941).
 Warner, Gordon & Draeger, Donn F. (1982). Japanese Swordsmanship: Technique And Practice,

External links

Shinbukan Dojo Official Website
Katori Shinto-ryu United Kingdom
Katori Shinto-ryu United States
Katori Shinto-ryu Kyōsō Shibu Official Website
Katori Shinto-ryu Soke Official Website

Ko-ryū bujutsu
Japanese martial arts